Lucignano d'Asso is a village in Tuscany, central Italy, in the comune of Montalcino, province of Siena.

Lucignano d'Asso is about 47 km from Siena and 16 km from Montalcino.

Bibliography 
 

Frazioni of Montalcino